Gregory Grant Desme (born April 4, 1986, in Bakersfield, California) is an American professional baseball center fielder who is a free agent. Desme was a junior right fielder at Cal Poly in San Luis Obispo, when he was drafted in 2007 by the Oakland Athletics. After a 30-30 2009 season in the minors and being named Arizona Fall League MVP, Desme retired. Desme came out of retirement in 2018 to play with the Lancaster Barnstormers of the independent Atlantic League of Professional Baseball.

Amateur career

High school 
He attended Stockdale High School in Bakersfield and was an all-area selection as a junior and senior. He was first-team selectee for the Southwest Yosemite League (SWYL). As a senior, he was co-Most Valuable Player of the SWYL.

College 
He started his college career at San Diego State University. He transferred to Cal Poly, where he was named 2007 Big West Conference Player of the Year.

Professional career

Oakland Athletics 
Desme began his professional baseball career with the Short-Season Vancouver Canadians of the Northwest League in 2007. Desme was selected in the second round of the 2007 Major League Baseball Draft before being assigned to the Canadians. He batted .261 with three doubles, one home run, six RBIs and two stolen bases in 12 games. The next season, 2008, he only played two games after he injured his wrist in 2007 and his shoulder the next year. In 2009, Desme had an extraordinary season. He hit a combined .288 with 31 doubles, six triples, 31 home runs, 89 RBIs and 40 stolen bases in 131 games with the Class-A Kane County Cougars and the Class-A Advanced Stockton Ports.

On January 22, 2010, it was reported that Desme planned to retire from professional baseball and study to become a priest. He said this about his situation:

He took the name Matthew Desme of the Norbertine Order. He said he found great peace in the vows of poverty, celibacy, and obedience.

Lancaster Barnstormers 
On May 22, 2018, Desme came out of retirement to join the Lancaster Barnstormers of the Atlantic League of Professional Baseball. He is serving as the head baseball coach at Ave Maria University. He became a free agent following the 2018 season.

References

External links

1986 births
Living people
American expatriate baseball players in Canada
Arizona League Athletics players
Baseball outfielders
Baseball players from Bakersfield, California
Kane County Cougars players
Cal Poly Mustangs baseball players
Catholics from California
Lancaster Barnstormers players
Premonstratensians
San Diego State Aztecs baseball players
Stockton Ports players
Vancouver Canadians players